Cornicephalus is a monotypic genus of East Asian dwarf spiders containing the single species, Cornicephalus jilinensis. It was first described by Michael I. Saaristo & J. Wunderlich in 1995, and has only been found in China.

See also
 List of Linyphiidae species

References

Linyphiidae
Monotypic Araneomorphae genera
Spiders of China